Duarte Silva (born 20 March 1924) is a Portuguese alpine skier. He was born in Lisbon. He competed at the 1952 Winter Olympics in Oslo, where he placed 69th in the downhill. He was the only participant from Portugal at the 1952 Olympics.

References

External links
  

1924 births
Possibly living people
Portuguese male alpine skiers
Sportspeople from Lisbon
Alpine skiers at the 1952 Winter Olympics
Olympic alpine skiers of Portugal